The Allied Forces Act 1940 (3 & 4 Geo. 6 c. 51) was an act of Parliament of the Parliament of the United Kingdom passed in late 1940, after the fall of France.

The act gave legal authority for the recognised sovereign governments of Belgium, Czechoslovakia, the Netherlands, Norway and Poland – all countries then under German occupation – to raise, equip and maintain independent armed forces on British soil. A sixth country, France, was provided for by authorising the activity of the Free French forces under Charles de Gaulle. The forces would be fully independent, under their own operational command and military law, though in practice it was expected that the British high command would direct general strategy and control joint operations. The act would later be extended to cover Luxembourg, Greece and Yugoslavia.

It allowed these nations to remain active and independent allies in the war, rather than simply providing manpower and moral support to the United Kingdom and the remainder of the British Empire.

After the act was passed, national units were quickly formed or reconstituted; by late October, the size of the Allied contingents serving with Home Forces were given as 18,000 Poles, 15,000 Norwegians and 3,000 Czechs, as well as around 3,000 Belgian, Dutch and French soldiers, as well as a large number of naval and air-force personnel.

It was amended and extended by the Allied Powers (War Service) Act 1942.

Notes

United Kingdom Acts of Parliament 1940
World War II national military histories
1940 in military history
United Kingdom in World War II
United Kingdom military law
World War II legislation